Amaury Gabriel Escoto Ruiz (born 30 November 1992) is a Mexican professional footballer who plays as a forward for Liga MX club Puebla.

Career

Querétaro F.C.
Born in Zapopan, Escoto made his professional debut for Querétaro F.C. on 30 April 2011 against Chiapas. He came on in the 75th minute for Efraín Cortés as Querétaro lost 4–1. He then scored his first goal for the club on 5 January 2013 against Club León in which his 90th-minute strike earned Querétaro a 2–2 draw.

Career statistics

Honours
Tigres UANL
Liga MX: Apertura 2015

BUAP
Ascenso MX: Clausura 2017

Individual
Liga MX Goal of the Tournament: 2017–18
CONCACAF Goal of the Year: 2017

References

External links 
 
  
 

1992 births
Living people
People from Zapopan, Jalisco
Footballers from Jalisco
Association football midfielders
Mexican footballers
Querétaro F.C. footballers
Tigres UANL footballers
Cafetaleros de Chiapas footballers
C.D. Suchitepéquez players
Lobos BUAP footballers
Deportivo Toluca F.C. players
Dorados de Sinaloa footballers
Liga MX players
Ascenso MX players
Mexican expatriate footballers
Expatriate footballers in Guatemala
Mexican expatriate sportspeople in Guatemala